Marcus Anthony Smith (born January 11, 1985 in San Diego, California) is a former American football wide receiver. He was drafted by the Baltimore Ravens in the fourth round of the 2008 NFL Draft. Smith was released by Baltimore during final cuts on September 3, 2011. He played college football at New Mexico.

Early years
Smith prepped at Morse High School in San Diego.

College career
Smith played college football at the University of New Mexico and graduated in 2008.  He was first-team Mountain West Conference for 2007.

Statistics
Source:

Professional career

Baltimore Ravens
Marcus Smith was selected by the Baltimore Ravens in the fourth round (106th overall) of the 2008 NFL Draft. He signed a three-year contract with the team on July 18.

Smith played in only 6 games in 2008, he did not have any receptions but had six tackles on special teams as a gunner.

Smith missed all of the 2009 season after he tore his ACL in a preseason game.

Smith returned in 2010 and notched 21 special teams tackles.

Marcus Smith was released by Baltimore during final cuts on September 3, 2011.

New Orleans VooDoo
On March 26, 2015, Smith was assigned to the New Orleans VooDoo of the Arena Football League. He was placed on reassignment on June 10, 2015.

References

External links
Baltimore Ravens bio
New Mexico Lobos bio

1985 births
Living people
Players of American football from San Diego
American football wide receivers
New Mexico Lobos football players
Baltimore Ravens players
Kentucky Drillers players
New Mexico Stars players
New Orleans VooDoo players